Ojo de Agua de Morán is a town within the municipality of the Atotonilco El Alto located in the southeastern part of the state of Jalisco in Mexico. It has 939 inhabitants. Ojo de Agua de Morán is 1980 meters above sea level. Along with neighbors of San Francisco de Asís, El Laurel, Agua Nueva, El Destierro, Los Adobes, Union de Guadalupe and La Purisima. A village founded in the 1750s by Morán de Ledesma families who are descendants of Salvador Morán de Ledesma (1630-1718) originally Teocaltiche, Jalisco.

Ancestry 
Traditionally, the region of Ojo de Agua de Morán is known for its inhabitants of descendants of conquistadors and early Spanish settlers such as De Villalobos, Ascencio de León, Hernández-Gamiño, Camarena, Martín del Campo, Rodríguez de Portugal, De La Torre-Ledesma, Vázquez de Zermeño, Romo de Vivar, Macías-Valadez, Guzmán de Quesada, González de Hermosillo and more. Most young men leave town to work in the United States. Also worth noting is the growing number of distinguished expatriates who emigrated to the US. These now reside particularly in California, Nashville, Houston, and the Chicago metropolitan area.

References

Municipalities of Jalisco